Ioan Mihail Racoviță (7 March 1889, Bucharest – 28 June 1954, Sighet Prison) was a Romanian general during World War II, and Minister of Defense in the aftermath of  King Michael's Coup of August 1944.

Biography 
In 1906 he was admitted to the Infantry and Cavalry Officers' School. After one year he was sent to pursue his training at the Military School in Hannover, Germany, from where he graduated in 1909.  Upon returning to Romania, he  was assigned with the rank of second lieutenant to the 2nd Roșiori Regiment from Bârlad.  He went back to Germany in 1910 to attend the Officers Riding School at Paderborn, which he completed in 1911. Promoted to lieutenant, he served with the 2nd Regiment in the Second Balkan War of 1913.  He fought during the Romanian Campaign of World War I, being promoted to captain in 1916, and to major in 1917.

After the war, Racoviță was admitted to the Higher War School, graduating in 1921. In 1923 he became a lieutenant colonel, and in 1928 a colonel. He was promoted to the rank of brigadier general in May 1936, and to major general in June 1940.

He commanded the Romanian Cavalry Corps during the initial phase of Operation Barbarossa in June 1941. With his corps he advanced from Romania to the Caucasus. He participated in Operation München, the Battle of the Sea of Azov and the Battle of the Caucasus. In May 1942 he was promoted to lieutenant general. He was replaced on 1 January 1943 and called back to Romania.

Racoviță was recalled into active service on 25 January 1944 and took over the command of the 4th Army, which had to be completely rebuilt after the Battle of Stalingrad. He led the army in spring and summer of 1944, in defensive battles in Northern Romania against the advancing Red Army. Together with the Wehrmacht, the 4th Army repulsed several Soviet attacks in the First Jassy-Kishinev Offensive, First Battle of Târgu Frumos and Second Battle of Târgu Frumos. In July 1944 he was awarded the Knight's Cross of the Iron Cross of Nazi Germany.

After King Michael's Coup on 23 August 1944, in which he played an important role, he was appointed Minister of Defense in the new pro-Allied government of General Constantin Sănătescu. He remained in this position until 5 November 1944, when he was named General Inspector of the Cavalry.

Between 20 May 1945 and 20 May 1946 Racoviță was the Commandant of 3rd Inspectorate-General. He was then promoted to the rank of general and given the command of the 1st Army until 30 June 1947. On 1 September 1947 he was retired.

In June 1950, he was arrested and imprisoned at Sighet Prison, where he died on 28 June 1954.

Awards
 Order of Michael the Brave 3rd Class (17 October 1941)
 Iron Cross (1941) 2nd and 1st Class
 Order of the Star of Romania 1st Class (1943)
 Knight's Cross of the Iron Cross (7 July 1944)

References

External links
 
 

1889 births
1954 deaths
Military personnel from Bucharest
Romanian Land Forces generals
Romanian military personnel of World War II
Recipients of the Order of Michael the Brave
Recipients of the Knight's Cross of the Iron Cross
Inmates of Sighet prison
Romanian Ministers of Defence
Mihail
Romanian military personnel of the Second Balkan War
Romanian military personnel of World War I
Carol I National Defence University alumni
Romanian people who died in prison custody
Prisoners who died in Romanian detention
Grand Officers of the Order of the Star of Romania